A. F. Golam Osmani (1 April 1933 – 31 March 2009) was a member of the 14th Lok Sabha of India. He represented the Barpeta constituency of Assam and was a member of the Indian National Congress (INC) political party. He died 31 March 2009 at the All India Institute of Medical Sciences (AIIMS) in New Delhi. He had been suffering from lung cancer.

He was earlier member of 12th and 13th Lok Sabha. During 1978-1982 he was elected twice to Assam legislative Assembly.

References

External links
 Home Page on the Parliament of India's Website

1933 births
2009 deaths
Indian National Congress politicians
21st-century Indian Muslims
India MPs 2004–2009
India MPs 1999–2004
India MPs 1998–1999
People from Cachar district
People from Barpeta district
Deaths from lung cancer in India
People from Silchar
Lok Sabha members from Assam
People from Barpeta
Assam MLAs 1978–1983
Assam MLAs 1985–1991
Bengali Muslims
21st-century Bengalis
20th-century Bengalis
Indian National Congress politicians from Assam